Brno Zoo is a zoo located in Brno-Bystrc, a municipal district of the city of Brno, Czech Republic. It was opened in 1953.

The zoo is involved in captive breeding of endangered species coordinated by the European Endangered Species Programme like the Sumatran tiger, giant Hispaniolan Galliwasp, Przewalski's horse, as well as locally threatened species like the Czech owl called the little owl, barn owl or rare rodent species the European ground squirrel and Eurasian beaver. In 2000, Brno Zoo became member in World Association of Zoos and Aquariums (WZO).

References

External links

Zoos in the Czech Republic
Buildings and structures in Brno
1953 establishments in Czechoslovakia
Zoos established in 1953
20th-century architecture in the Czech Republic